Julekonserten was a Norwegian Christmas concert which was held every year between 1989 and 1999. Julekonserten toured in Scandinavia, and visited cities in Norway, Sweden and Denmark with a mix of Scandinavian artists. The long list of artists and performers includes Sissel Kyrkjebø, The Chieftains, Oslo Gospel Choir, Triple & Touch, Rune Larsen, Tor Endresen and Kurt Ravn. Every year Julekonserten (the concerts in Oslo and Gjøvik) was also broadcast on Television in Norway, Sweden and Denmark. Stageway AS arranged these concerts and a part of the money went to aid children on the street in La Paz and Santa Cruz in Bolivia.

Two CDs were released from their concerts, Julekonserten (1996) and Julekonserten 10 år (1999). A rare recording of Sissel Kyrkjebø performing My Tribute (To God Be The Glory) with Oslo Gospel Choir at Julekonserten 1997 in Gjøvik can be found on the 1998 compilation album The Best of Sissel.

Track listing

Julekonserten (1996)
 Mitt hjerte alltid vanker - Sissel Kyrkjebø
 O Come All Ye Faithful - Oslo Gospel Choir
 Gabriel's Message - Ole Edvard Antonsen
 Mary's Boy Child - Sissel Kyrkjebø
 Det hev ei rose sprunge - Sissel Kyrkjebø
 Hark! The Herald Angels Sing - Sissel Kyrkjebø
 Julenatt - Oslo Gospel Choir
 Whence Is That Goodly Fragrance Flowing? - Sissel Kyrkjebø & Ole Edvard Antonsen
 What Child Is This? - Oslo Gospel Choir
 O Helga Natt - Oslo Gospel Choir
 Glade Jul - Ole Edvard Antonsen

Julekonserten 10 år (1999)
 Introduktion - Orchestra
 Nu Tändas Tusen Juleljus - Sissel Kyrkjebø, Triple & Touch, Kim Sjøgren & The Little Mermaid String Quartet & Oslo Gospel Choir
 Hark! The Herald Angels Sing - Sissel Kyrkjebø
 O Come All Ye Faithful - Oslo Gospel Choir
 En Stjerne Skinner I Natt - Oslo Gospel Choir
 Rockin' Around The Christmas Tree - Tor Endresen
 Mitt hjerte alltid vanker - Sissel Kyrkjebø & The Chieftains
 Happy Xmas (War Is Over) - Triple & Touch
 Glade jul - Ole Edvard Antonsen
 Jingle Bells - Tor Endresen & Rune Larsen
 O Helga Natt - Oslo Gospel Choir
 Ave Verum - Kim Sjøgren & The Little Mermaid String Quartet
 My Tribute (To God Be The Glory) - Sissel Kyrkjebø & Oslo Gospel Choir
 Deilig er Jorden - Alle & Kjelsås skoles barnekor

References

External links

 

1995 live albums
1999 live albums
Concert tours